The 2006 ARAG World Team Cup was a tennis tournament play on outdoor clay courts. It was the 28th edition of the World Team Cup, and was part of the 2006 ATP Tour. It took place at the Rochusclub in Düsseldorf, Germany, from 21 through 27 May 2006.

Argentina were the defending champions but they failed to advance beyond the group stage.
Croatia defeated Germany in the final, by two rubbers to one for their first title.

Players

Red group

Ivan Ljubičić (# 4)
Mario Ančić (# 12)
Ivo Karlović (# 51)

Fernando González (# 9)
Nicolás Massú (# 35)
Paul Capdeville (# 124)
Adrián García (# 197 Doubles)

David Ferrer (# 15)
Fernando Verdasco (# 31)
Feliciano López (# 46)

Andy Roddick (# 5)
James Blake (# 8)
Robby Ginepri (# 17)
Bob Bryan (# 1 Doubles)
Mike Bryan (# 1 Doubles)

Blue group

Nicolas Kiefer (# 13)
Philipp Kohlschreiber (# 83) 
Alexander Waske (# 38 Doubles)
Michael Kohlmann (# 53 Doubles)

Tomáš Berdych (# 20)
Robin Vik (# 67)
Leoš Friedl (# 18 Doubles)

David Nalbandian (# 3)
Gastón Gaudio (# 10)
José Acasuso (# 29)
Sebastián Prieto (# 26 Doubles)

Filippo Volandri (# 55)
Davide Sanguinetti (# 65)

 Rankings are as of May 22, 2006

Round robin

Red group

Standings

Chile vs. Spain

Croatia vs. United States of America

Croatia vs. Spain

Chile vs. United States of America

Spain vs. United States of America

Chile vs. Croatia

Blue group

Standings

Germany vs. Italy

Argentina vs. Czech Republic

Argentina vs. Germany

Czech Republic vs. Italy

Argentina vs. Italy

Czech Republic vs. Germany

Final

Croatia vs. Germany

See also
2006 Davis Cup World Group
2006 Hopman Cup

External links
Draw

World Team Cup
World Team Cup, 2006
World Team Cup